Sabki Bajegi Band is the first Indian reality film written and directed by Anirudh Chawla and produced by Yusuf Shaikh. The film is presented by Percept Pictures and Yen Movies.

Cast
 Sumeet Vyas as Amit 
 Swara Bhaskar as Jaya 
 Alekh Sangal as Harsh 
 Shaurya Chauhan as Savvy 
 Amol Parashar as Siddharth “Sid”
 Aman Uppal as Karan
 Jhanvi Desai as Pallavi 
 Samarth Shandilya as DK 
 Nisha Lalwani as Vasna 
 Rajkummar Rao as Randeep “Randy”

Production

Anirudh Chawla had hosted a farmhouse party for his friends who are well known names in the party circuit, television and film industry. There were hidden cameras at the venue and candid conversations and confessions got recorded. When Anirudh Chawla and Yusuf Shaikh saw the raw uncensored footage they decided to turn it in to a reality film.

Critical reception
Times of india  gave 1 out of 5 and said dialogues are 'poor' would be an understatement. Each character displays passion for spouting ridiculous mindless statements that make you cringe.

References

External links
 
Sabki Bajegi Band on Facebook
Sabki Bajegi Band on Twitter

2015 films
2010s Hindi-language films